"(He'll Never Be An) Ol' Man River" is a song by Australian alternative rock band TISM, released in June 1995 as the second single from their third studio album, Machiavelli and the Four Seasons. The song peaked at number 23 on the ARIA Charts, becoming the band's highest charting single and polled at number 9 in the Triple J Hottest 100, 1995

The band performed the song on the RMITV show Under Melbourne Tonight in April 1995.

The track is a brutal takedown of celebrity worship, using the then-recent passing of River Phoenix as its focus and contains the opening line, "I'm on the drug that killed River Phoenix".

Controversy surrounded the release of this track. Red Hot Chili Peppers' Australian-born bassist Michael "Flea" Balzary (a close friend of Phoenix) reportedly left "wanting to kill" TISM.

TISM addressed this controversy in 2004: "By the same token, Hitler-Barassi says, 'I'm on the drug that killed River Phoenix', the line that famously enraged Red Hot Chili Peppers bassist Flea, 'wasn't about River Phoenix at all. That song was about fame, and the people listed in it weren't even real celebrities."

The single was issued with a second "pills" cover after a version depicting a mockup of Phoenix's tombstone was withdrawn.

Track list
CD single (G003)
 "(He'll Never Be An) Ol' Man River" - 2:25
 "Abscess Makes the Heart Grow Fonder" - 2:47
 "Dicktatorship" - 2:00

Personnel
 Damian Cowell - lead vocals (choruses)
 Peter Minack - lead vocals (verses)
 Jack Holt - bass
 James Paull - electric guitar
 Eugene Cester - keyboards

Charts

References

1995 singles
TISM songs
Songs about death
Songs about heroin
1995 songs
Satirical songs